8 Canada Square (also known as the HSBC Tower) is a skyscraper in Canary Wharf, London. The building serves as the global headquarters of the HSBC Group. The building has 45 storeys and houses approximately 8,000 employees.

Design and construction
Having been commissioned by the owners of the Canary Wharf Site to do the outline design prior to gaining site-wide outline planning permission, and because he had designed HSBC's last head office at 1 Queen's Road, Central, Hong Kong Island, Hong Kong, Sir Norman Foster (now Lord Foster of Thames Bank) was appointed as architect.

Construction began in January 1999, with work beginning on the installation of the 4,900 glass panels commencing in the summer of 2000. The work was carried out by Canary Wharf Contractors. In May 2000, three workmen were killed in a crane accident.

The topping out ceremony took place on 7 March 2001, with the hoisting in of the final steel girder attended by bankers, journalists and contractors. The first HSBC employees began work in the building on 2 September 2002, with phased occupation completed by 17 February 2003, and the building's official opening, by Sir John Bond, taking place on 2 April 2003.

Ownership
In April 2007, HSBC Tower was sold to Spanish property company Metrovacesa, becoming the first building in Britain to be sold for more than £1bn. As part of the sale, HSBC retained occupancy control and agreed a 20-year lease at a cost of £43.5m per annum. 

In December 2008, after Metrovacesa encountered problems with re-financing the bridging loan that HSBC had provided it and as part of a wider debt restructure for Metrovacesa, the bank bought back the property. HSBC stated it had made a £250m profit on the deal.

In November 2009, HSBC once again sold the building, this time to the National Pension Service ("NPS"), the public pension fund for South Korea. HSBC's income statement on completion declared a gain of approximately £350million resulting from the transaction.

In December 2014, Qatar Investment Authority completed the purchase of this building at an undisclosed price, but the building was expected to fetch more than £1.1 billion (US$1.73 billion). NPS was advised by the estate agents Jones Lang LaSalle and GM Real Estate.

Stephen and Stitt

8 Canada Square has a pair of bronze lions guarding the main entrance. These are copies of a pair nicknamed "Stephen" and "Stitt" which have stood outside the Bank's Headquarters at 1 Queen's Road Central in Hong Kong since 1935. The Hong Kong lions are named after yet another pair of lions that guarded the Bank's Shanghai headquarters on The Bund after it opened in 1923.

The lions were cast within sight of the development by the Bronze Age Sculpture Casting Foundry in Limehouse.

See also

List of HSBC buildings around the world
List of tallest buildings and structures in London
List of tallest buildings and structures in the United Kingdom
List of tallest buildings in the United Kingdom

References

External links

Foster and Partners' website
The London Foundry that copied and cast the lions

Canary Wharf buildings
Skyscrapers in the London Borough of Tower Hamlets
Buildings and structures in the London Borough of Tower Hamlets
HSBC buildings and structures
Foster and Partners buildings
Office buildings completed in 2002
Bank buildings in the United Kingdom
2002 establishments in England
Skyscraper office buildings in London